Bhirkot is a village development committee in Tanahu District in the Gandaki Zone of central Nepal. At the time of the 2011 Nepal census it had a population of 5014 people living in 1146 individual households. It lies northwest of Baidi. It lies on a steep mountain top overlooking a deep valley in which the Kali River passes. The village contains a health camp.

References

External links
UN map of the municipalities of Tanahu District
Health camp video

Populated places in Tanahun District